The Honda Civic Type R TCR is a racing car built on the basis of the TCR rules established in 2015, which is included in the World Touring Car Cup under the direction of the FIA. In 2019 and 2020, it won the TCR Model of the Year award, which is given for the most successful car in the category across a year.

History

FK2 (2015) 

The first Civic Type R TCR was built on the ninth generation Honda Civic and debuted in the TCR International Series in 2015, until the end of 2017, including Gianni Morbidelli, Roberto Colciago and Attila Tassi racing with machines developed by JAS Motorsport, the last two riders fought for the individual championship title (as a teammate) in the 2017 season, with Tassi finishing in second place behind Jean-Karl Vernay, while Colciago finished fifth in the overall standings, their team won by the teams led by Norbert Michelisz and David Bári. In the ADAC TCR Germany Touring Car Championship, British driver Josh Files won an individual championship for the model in 2017.

FK8 (2017)  

The thoroughly wrinkled version introduced in 2017 is already based on the street version of the tenth generation Civic - which later set a lap record on the Nürburgring Nordschleife - but has been modified at several points on the street model body to reduce air resistance and greater clamping force. el. A new multi-link rear suspension and modified stabilizer have been used, a state-of-the-art electronic control unit (ECU) and an improved roll bar have been installed. An endurance version of the car was also made for customers in long-distance races, this edition was equipped with headlights and an air intake system to cool the driver, as well as brakes complete with ABS. The new model has 340 horsepower and a maximum torque of 420 Nm.

The model began selling to customer teams on 15 December 2017. For the year 2018, a total of 25 copies of the new model were available (this number was already 133 on 18 December 2019).

Championship titles

References

External links

 JAS Motorsport official website

Honda Civic
TCR cars
Cars introduced in 2015
Front-wheel-drive vehicles
Civic Type R TCR